Michael F. Grunebaum is a New York City psychiatrist, born in the 1950s. He graduated from Harvard College for his bachelor's degree (1983) and Harvard Medical School for his medical degree (1991). He has worked at the New York State Psychiatric Institute and in private practice in Manhattan. He is also an associate professor of psychiatry at Columbia University Medical School. His research is in the area of mood disorders and suicidal behavior. Several of his research papers are highly cited according to Google Scholar.

References

Living people
American psychiatrists
Harvard Medical School alumni
Columbia Medical School faculty
Year of birth missing (living people)